Bistonis is a nymph in Greek mythology who gave birth to a son of Ares, Tereus. Although she is mentioned in several surviving classical texts, she is the main subject of few or none.  In at least one poem, written by Moschus in the 3rd century BCE, Lake Bistonis, in Thrace, is referred to as being her  lake, and that lake is described as having a population of nymphs:

Her name is similar to the name of a city in Thrace, Bistonia, said in ancient Greek mythology to have been built on the shores of that lake by Biston, who was the son of Ares and Callirrhoe.

References

 MYTHOLOGY.; BELLONA. VICTORY. THE STORY OF TEREUS.
The Family Magazine; or, Monthly Abstract of General Knowledge (1833-1841); Apr 1835; 2, APS Online 
pg. A103

Nymphs
Mythological Thracian women
Greek mythology of Thrace